is a Shinto shrine located in Kyōto, Kyōto Prefecture, Japan. It is dedicated to the divinity Susanoo /  under the name .

See also
List of Shinto shrines in Japan

References

External links
Saginomori Jinja history

Shinto shrines in Japan